Sondre Justad (born 15 October 1990) is a Norwegian musician and songwriter.

Biography 
Justad grew up in Henningsvær in Lofoten, Northern Norway and went to upper secondary school in Bodø, Northern Norway. He began publishing his own music at the age of 16.

Justad released his first single, "Nu har du mæ", in 2014 on Petroleum Records which was a radio hit. In February and July 2015 he followed up with the singles "Det e over" and "Tilbake".

In October 2015, he released the debut album Riv i hjertet. The album entered the Norwegian chart VG-lista Topp 20. He has also been doing TV appearances on TV2 Senkveld and P3 Gull.

Ingenting i paradis received positive reviews in Norway with Dagbladet giving it 4/5 stars.

In 2019 he was nominated to four categories of the Spellemannprisen music awards.

He sings in the Northern Norwegian dialect. His lyrics are described as being open and honest and are often about love and heartbreak. He is openly bisexual.

Discography

Albums
 Riv i hjertet (2015)
 Ingenting i paradis (2018)
 En Anna Mæ (2022) – No. 3 Norway

Singles/EP
 Nu har du mæ (2014)
 Det e over (2015)
 Tilbake (2015)
 Riv i hjertet (2015)
 Tida vi bare va (2016)
 Ingenting (2017)
 Paradis (2017)
 Gjør det igjen (2018)
 Ikke som de andre (2018)
 Fontena på Youngstorget (2019)
 Pause fra mæ sjøl (2021)

References

External links

 

1990 births
Living people
Norwegian songwriters
21st-century Norwegian male singers
Bisexual singers
Bisexual songwriters
Norwegian LGBT singers
Norwegian LGBT songwriters
Norwegian bisexual people